The Department of Safety and Security (UNDSS) is a department of the United Nations providing safety and security services for United Nations agencies and departments as part of the United Nations Safety Management System. UNDSS reports directly to the Secretary-General. The UNDSS manages a network of security advisers, analysts, officers and coordinators in more than 125 countries in support of around
180,000 United Nations personnel, 400,000 dependents, and 4,500 United Nations premises worldwide. The department is led by Under-Secretary-General Gilles Michaud from Canada.

Mandate 
Mission: To enable United Nations system operations through trusted security leadership and solutions.

Vision: Security for the United Nations, for a better world.

Legal Documents: UN Security is underpinned by five main legal documents, outlining the responsibilities of all stakeholders:
 United Nations Charter – articles 104 and 105
 Conventions on Privileges and Immunities of the United Nations (1946 and 1947)
 Convention on Safety and Security of United Nations Personnel and Associated Personnel (1994) – Optional Protocol (2005)
 Annual Resolutions of the General Assembly on Safety and Security of UN personnel and associated personnel
 UNSMS Security Policy Manual

Objectives:
 Leadership: UNDSS provides critical advice and rapid decision-making capacity on UNSMS (United Nations Security Management System) policy and operational issues to UNSMS members, senior United Nations management and personnel.
 Security Management: The department provides services with security risk management capabilities and strategies to address multi-dimensional security challenges. The Security Risk Management (SRM) identifies, analyzes and manages safety and security risks to United Nations personnel, assets and operations.
 Policy: UNDSS supports decision-making process with a solid policy framework with security policies covering all aspects of security management and ensuring cohesion within the UNSMS.
 Workforce: UNDSS develops and maintains a professional and effective safety and security workforce.
 Specialized Services: UNDSS delivers specialized safety and security services by offering the necessary expertise to stay ahead of the fast-paced changes in the security environment.

History 
For the first half-century of its existence, if United Nations personnel were directly targeted, it was generally viewed as an isolated event. In the early 1990s, the security environment for the United Nations changed and became more threatening. There was a rise in the number of deaths and injuries to personnel as a result of malicious acts. The mandate of the United Nations also evolved, resulting in a larger number of United Nations personnel, notably from the humanitarian agencies, being deployed on potentially hazardous missions.
At the same time, peacekeeping missions were being established in areas at war or in situations of high risk. Increasingly, humanitarian personnel were being deployed alongside peacekeeping military units in integrated multidisciplinary missions.

An evolving security management system 
The UN's security management system was designed for the operational requirements which existed in the UN's early days. To allow the United Nations to meet new demands in a changing environment, the General Assembly authorized an increase in the staff of the Office of the United Nations Security Coordinator (UNSECOORD), primarily in the field. In 2001, the General Assembly authorized the creation of a full-time United Nations Security Coordinator at the level of Assistant Secretary-General. By 2002, the number of professional security officer posts in the field numbered 100 Professional and 200 locally recruited posts.

The United Nations Security Coordinator oversaw the activities of the UN field security management system and was a senior official appointed by the Secretary-General. The Office was responsible for all policy and procedural matters related to security; to ensure a coherent response by the United Nations to any emergency situation; coordinating, planning and implementing inter-agency security programmes and acting as the focal point for inter-agency cooperation concerning all security matters and taking decisions related to the relocation/evacuation of personnel and their eligible dependents from very insecure areas.

In addition to UNSECOORD, the Department of Peacekeeping Operations (DPKO) had in place its own separate security structure for civilian personnel in UN peacekeeping operations. Political missions of the Department of Political Affairs that were administratively backstopped by DPKO remained under the UN field security management system. Each of the major UN locations around the world had their own Security and Safety Services, which operated independently from the UN security management system and from any central direction.

The Security and Safety Service (SSS) was first established at UN Headquarters in 1948. For decades, SSS in New York and at seven other Secretariat headquarters locations around the world (Geneva, Vienna, Nairobi, Bangkok, Beirut, Addis Ababa and Santiago), operated independently of each other and had no common governance structure. Their role was to provide security and safety for headquarters personnel, premises and operations at those locations, as well to protect delegates and visitors to the premises and provide personal security details for senior United Nations officials and visiting dignitaries.

Between 2002 and 2003, efforts were made by the United Nations Security Coordinator to professionalize the organization's security for its personnel through improved recruitment and training, and to institutionalize security coordination among United Nations agencies, funds, and programmes through the establishment of an Inter-Agency Security Management Network (IASMN). However, security structures in PKOs and SPMs, as well as in SSS locations continued to function as separate entities to the structure in place for the field.

In early August 2003, independent security experts carried out an analysis of the UN security management system, and concluded that the development and implementation of an overall security governance and accountability framework, including headquarters, humanitarian and development personnel and civilian personnel in peacekeeping missions would lead to a strengthened and unified security management system.

The Ahtisaari Panel 
Despite the growing security concerns and the efforts to address them the UN Headquarters at the Canal Hotel in Baghdad was attacked on 19 August 2003. The attack, carried out by a suicide bomber driving a truck filled with explosives, killed 22 United Nations personnel and visitors and injured more than 150 people.
The attack was the first significant and targeted attack against the United Nations calling to attention the limited coordination and cohesion of security provisions for UN staff and premises globally. The attacks led to an urgent second review of the security system by the Independent Panel on the Safety and Security of United Nations Personnel, known as the Ahtisaari panel.

The Ahtisaari panel called for a new, drastically revised security strategy for the United Nations. The panel recommended that the core elements of the new strategy include clear articulation of the responsibilities of the United Nations to ensure the security of its personnel; the establishment of professional assessment tools for the analysis of threat and risks for United Nations operations worldwide; a robust security management system with adequate disciplinary measures to counter non-compliance; accountability at all managerial levels for the implementation of security regulations; and significant increases in resources to develop and maintain the necessary security infrastructure.

UNDSS establishment 
In 2004, a proposal for strengthening and unifying the United Nations security management system was presented to the 59th session of the General Assembly in Report A/59/365 of 11 October 2004. This resulted in the adoption of General Assembly Resolution (A/RES/59/276 December 2004) that created the Department of Safety and Security which merged the security management component of the Office of the United Nations Security Coordinator (UNSECOORD) and the Security and Safety Services (SSS) at Headquarters and at Offices away from Headquarters, (including the regional commissions).

Furthermore, the Resolution mandated that the new department be headed by a senior UN official at the rank of Under-Secretary-General for a non-renewable term of five years. The General Assembly also adopted measures to reinforce security operations in all locations and decided to establish a unified capacity for policy, standards, coordination, communications, compliance and threat and risk assessment.

The United Nations Department of Safety and Security (UNDSS) was formally established on 1 January 2005.

Criticism and Controversy 
Despite an official stance by United Nations working groups against the use of private military and security companies except as a last resort, the UNDSS has widely contracted private military companies across deployments in various nations. Further audits by the United Nations Joint Inspection Unit revealed that despite having the mandate of unifying security responses, the UNDSS suffered from leadership, staffing, and funding issues especially pervasive due to the lack of coordination between UN agencies and multi-leveled bodies of the United Nations Security Management System responsible for ensuring the safety of UN staff.

References 

Report of the Secretary-General on the Safety and Security of Humanitarian Personnel and Protection of United Nations Personnel
United Nations Charter – articles 104 and 105
Conventions on Privileges and Immunities of the United Nations (1946 and 1947)
Convention on Safety and Security of United Nations Personnel and Associated Personnel (1994) – Optional Protocol (2005)
Annual Resolutions of the General Assembly on Safety and Security of UN personnel and associated personnel
UNSMS Security Policy Manual - 2017 (Archived)

External links 
Official site
United Nations Official site

United Nations Secretariat
Safety organizations
Security organizations